His Wife (French: Son épouse) is a 2014 French psychological drama film directed by Michel Spinosa and starring Yvan Attal, newcomer Janagi and Charlotte Gainsbourg.

Plot 
After Joseph's wife Catherine dies, he goes to a village near Pondicherry where he meets Gracie, who may be possessed by Catherine's spirit.

Cast 
Yvan Attal as Joseph
Janagi as Gracie
Charlotte Gainsbourg as Catherine
Mahesh as Anthony
Laguparan as Gracie's brother
Nirupama Nityanadan

Release 
The film premiered at the Berlin International Film Festival on 7 February 2014, after which it was released in France on 12 March 2014. His Wife was given a limited theatrical release in the United States on 27 February 2014.

Reception 
Jordan Mintzer of The Hollywood Reporter  wrote that the film is "an audacious and often impressive continent-hopping drama" and added that the film is "marked by an impressive sense of visual storytelling". Ronnie Scheib of Variety opined that "Skillful time shuffling and a compelling performance by Charlotte Gainsbourg anchor this flawed but fascinating cross-cultural drama". Jacques Mandelbaum of Le Monde stated that the film does not rise to the expected level.

References

External links 

2010s French-language films
French psychological drama films
2010s French films